Alankent (former Yakacık) is a town in Kabataş district of Ordu Province, Turkey. At  it is situated in the mountainous area of Black Sea Region. The population of the Alankent is 5080 as of 2011. Up to 11th century the area around the town was a part of Hittites, Achaemenid Empire,
Macedonian Empire, Roman Empire and Byzantine Empire.  In 1083, it was incorporated into Danishment realm and in the second half of the 12th century it was captured by the Seljuks. After the chaotic era following the Mongol invasion it was captured by Hacıemmioğlu of Canik Beylik. In 1427, Yorgüç Pasha of the Ottoman Empire annexed the region to Ottoman realm. In 1967 it was declared a seat of township. In 1967 Alankent was declared a seat of township.

References

External links
For images

Populated places in Ordu Province
Towns in Turkey
Kabataş District